Cry No Fear is a 2018 Filipino thriller film written and directed by  Richard Somes, starring Ella Cruz and Donnalyn Bartolome. The film was produced by Viva Films and it was released in the Philippines on 20 June 2018.

Cast

References

External links

Viva Films films
Philippine thriller films